Mirta Gloria Yáñez Quiñoa is a Cuban philologist, teacher and writer. She graduated from high school in Raúl Cepero Bonilla Special Pre-university Institute where she was considered a high-performing student.  She entered the University of Havana in 1965, graduating five years later. She earned a PhD in philology (1992) at the same university, specializing in Latin American and Cuban literature, as well as in studies on Cuban women's literary discourse. She worked for many years teaching and conducting research at the University of Havana.

Awards 
 1970: Premio de Poesía del Concurso 13 de Marzo por el poemario Las visitas
 1977: Premio de Narrativa del concurso La Edad de Oro
 1988: Premio de la Crítica por el libro de cuentos El diablo son las cosas
 1990: Premio de la Crítica por el ensayo La narrativa romántica en Latinoamérica 
 1999: Premio Memoria otorgado por el Centro Cultural Pablo de la Torriente Brau
 2001: Forderpreis der Iniciative LiBeraturpreis, Frankfurt, Alemania  
 2005: Premio de la Crítica por el libro de cuentos Falsos Documentos
 2010: Premio de la Crítica por la novela Sangra por la herida
 2012: Premio de la Academia Cubana de la Lengua por Sangra por la herida

Selected works

Stories 
 Sangra por la herida, 2010
 El búfalo ciego y otros cuentos, 2008 
 Serafín y las aventuras en el Reino de los Comejenes, 2007 
 Falsos documentos. Cuentos, 2005
 Narraciones desordenadas e incompletas, 1997 (in Spanish)
 El diablo son las cosas. Cuentos, 1988 (in Spanish)
 La hora de los mameyes, 1983 (in Spanish)
 Yo soy Jack Johnson, 1982 (in Spanish)
 La Habana es una ciudad bien grande, 1980 (in Spanish)
 Serafín y sus aventuras con los caballitos, 1979 (in Spanish)
 Todos los negros tomamos café, 1976 (in Spanish)

Poetry 
 Un solo bosque negro, 2003 (in Spanish)
 Algún lugar en ruinas, 1997 (in Spanish)
 Poesía casi completa de Jiribilla el conejo, 1994 (in Spanish)
 Poemas, 1987 (in Spanish)
 Las visitas y otros poemas, 1986 (in Spanish)
 Las visitas, 1971 (in Spanish)

Essays and critiques 
 Cubanas a capítulo. Segunda temporada, 2009 (in Spanish)
 El Matadero: un modelo para desarmar, 2005 (in Spanish)
 Cubanas a capítulo, 2000 (in Spanish)
 La narrativa romántica en Latinoamérica, 1990 (in Spanish)
 El mundo literario prehispánico (collaboration), 1986 (in Spanish)

References

External links 
 Yáñez, Mirta – Poeta, Narradora, Ensayista at cubaliteraria.com
 Mirta Yáñez at caribenet.info
 Entrevista con Mirta Yáñez: una manera de pensar diferente at Lehman College

Living people
1947 births
Cuban women writers
Cuban philologists
Women philologists
Cuban essayists
Cuban women essayists
Cuban poets
Cuban women poets